Canadian studies is an interdisciplinary field of undergraduate- and postgraduate-level study of Canadian culture and society, the languages of Canada, Canadian literature, media and communications, Quebec, Acadians, agriculture in Canada, natural resources and geography of Canada, the history of Canada and historiography of Canada, Canadian government and politics, and legal traditions. Similar ranges of subjects centred on indigenous peoples in Canada (First Nations, Inuit, Métis) may be part of Indigenous (Native) Studies, Canadian Studies or both.

Several universities that offer Canadian studies undergraduate degrees recommend that students take a double major (e.g. Political Science, International Relations or French), if not included in the course. Some careers for students who take Canadian studies include the foreign service and working at Canadian embassies or the foreign embassies in Canada.

Scholars known for their work in Canadian studies include Fernand Ouellet, Linda Hutcheon, George Ramsay Cook, William T. R. Fox, Annette Baker Fox, Susan Swan, Christl Verduyn, Sergey Rogov, and George Melnyk. The Governor General's International Award for Canadian Studies is an award for excellence in the field and was established in 1995 by the International Council for Canadian Studies. The International Council for Canadian Studies is a confederal academic society including the Canadian Studies Network which is based in Canada, and Canadian Studies associations in numerous other countries. The Association for Canadian Studies aims to connect Canadian Studies scholarship with the Canadian public.

See also
American studies
Area studies
Cultural studies

Further reading
 Dirk Hoerder, From the Study of Canada to Canadian Studies: To Know Our Many Selves Changing Across Time and Space (Augsburg: Wißner-Verlag, 2005), .

External links
 Canadian Studies: A Guide to the Sources

Canadian culture
Area studies